Nymphicula fionae is a moth in the family Crambidae. It was described by David John Lawrence Agassiz in 2014. It is found on Rossel Island in Papua New Guinea.

The wingspan is about 12.5 mm. The base of the forewings is brown with a brown costa and a straw antemedian fascia, edged with dark brown. The median area is suffused with brown. The base of the hindwings is brown and the subbasal fascia is white.

Etymology
The species is named for the former wife of the author.

References

Nymphicula
Moths described in 2014